The Austrian Athletics Championships is an annual outdoor track and field competition organised by the Austrian Athletics Federation, which serves as the national championship for the sport in Austria. The competition was first held in 1911 and women's events were included shortly after in 1918. Separate annual championship events are held for cross country running, road running and racewalking events.

Men

100 metres
1960: Elmar Kunauer
1961: Waldemar Berger
1962: Gert Nöster
1963: Waldemar Berger
1964: Günther Gehrer
1965: Gert Nöster
1966: Gert Nöster
1967: Axel Nepraunik
1968: Axel Nepraunik
1969: Axel Nepraunik
1970: Gert Herunter
1971: Gerald Herzig
1972: Axel Nepraunik
1973: Georg Regner
1974: Georg Regner
1975: Peter Mateyka
1976: Gernot Massing
1977: Peter Mateyka
1978: Gernot Massing
1979: Josef Mayr
1980: Josef Mayr
1981: Roland Jokl
1982: Roland Jokl
1983: Roland Jokl
1984: Andreas Berger
1985: Andreas Berger
1986: Andreas Berger
1987: Andreas Berger
1988: Andreas Berger
1989: Andreas Berger
1990: Franz Ratzenberger
1991: Andreas Berger
1992: Christoph Pöstinger
1993: Martin Schützenauer
1994: Martin Schützenauer
1995: Martin Schützenauer
1996: Martin Schützenauer
1997: Martin Lachkovics
1998: Elmar Lichtenegger
1999: Martin Lachkovics
2000: Martin Lachkovics
2001: Michael Kummer
2002: Michael Kummer
2003: Martin Lachkovics
2004: Roland Kwitt
2005: Sergey Osovic
2006: Martin Lachkovics

200 metres
1960: Elmar Kunauer
1961: Elmar Kunauer
1962: Heinz-Georg Kamler
1963: Heinz-Georg Kamler
1964: Gert Nöster
1965: Gert Nöster
1966: Gert Nöster
1967: Gert Nöster
1968: Axel Nepraunik
1969: Axel Nepraunik
1970: Gert Herunter
1971: Gert Nöster
1972: Axel Nepraunik
1973: Günther Würfel
1974: Günther Würfel
1975: Günther Würfel
1976: Gernot Massing
1977: Peter Mateyka
1978: Peter Mateyka
1979: Alois Zettl
1980: Heinz Hutter
1981: Roland Jokl
1982: Roland Jokl
1983: Roland Jokl
1984: Andreas Berger
1985: Andreas Berger
1986: Andreas Berger
1987: Andreas Berger
1988: Andreas Berger
1989: Andreas Berger
1990: Jürgen Böckle
1991: Thomas Renner
1992: Christoph Pöstinger
1993: Thomas Griesser
1994: Thomas Griesser
1995: Thomas Griesser
1996: Andreas Rechbauer
1997: Christoph Pöstinger
1998: Hans-Peter Welz
1999: Martin Lachkovics
2000: Martin Lachkovics
2001: Hans-Peter Welz
2002: Thomas Scheidl
2003: Thomas Scheidl
2004: Roland Kwitt
2005: Roland Kwitt
2006: Martin Lachkovics

400 metres
1960: Wolfgang Pattermann
1961: Wolfgang Pattermann
1962: Helmut Haid
1963: Paul Vago
1964: Siegfried Härle
1965: Hermann Hosp
1966: Peter Hrandek
1967: Ernst Zangerl
1968: Helmut Haid
1969: Alfred Wolf
1970: Alfred Wolf
1971: Gert Weinhandl
1972: Alfred Wolf
1973: Herbert Schrautzer
1974: Herbert Schrautzer & Alois Zettl
1975: Alois Zettl
1976: Alex Fortelny
1977: Alex Fortelny
1978: Alex Fortelny
1979: Alex Fortelny
1980: Alex Fortelny
1981: Herwig Tavernaro
1982: Herwig Tavernaro
1983: Thomas Futterknecht
1984: Thomas Futterknecht
1985: Thomas Futterknecht
1986: Klaus Ehrle
1987: Klaus Ehrle
1988: Alfred Hugl
1989: Thomas Futterknecht
1990: Alfred Hugl
1991: Andreas Rapek
1992: Klaus Angerer
1993: Klaus Angerer
1994: Klaus Angerer
1995: Klaus Angerer
1996: Andreas Rechbauer
1997: Rafik Elouardi
1998: Andreas Rechbauer
1999: Andreas Rechbauer
2000: Andreas Rechbauer
2001: Andreas Rechbauer
2002: Andreas Rechbauer
2003: Ralf Hegny
2004: Ralf Hegny
2005: Ralf Hegny
2006: Ralf Hegny

800 metres
1960: Rudolf Klaban
1961: Rudolf Klaban
1962: Rudolf Klaban
1963: Rudolf Klaban
1964: Rudolf Klaban
1965: Volker Tulzer
1966: Rudolf Klaban
1967: Volker Tulzer
1968: Hermann Hosp
1969: Hermann Hosp
1970: Volker Tulzer
1971: Walter Grabul
1972: Horst Rothauer
1973: Horst Rothauer
1974: Karl Sander
1975: Horst Rothauer
1976: Günther Pichler
1977: Karl Sander
1978: Robert Nemeth
1979: 
1980: 
1981: Robert Nemeth
1982: Robert Nemeth
1983: Peter Schwarzenpoller
1984: Herwig Tavernaro
1985: Peter Svaricek
1986: Peter Svaricek
1987: Herwig Tavernaro
1988: Karl Blaha
1989: Peter Svaricek
1990: Bernhard Richter
1991: Werner Edler-Muhr
1992: Werner Edler-Muhr
1993: Michael Wildner
1994: Thomas Ebner
1995: Michael Wildner
1996: Michael Wildner
1997: Michael Wildner
1998: Oliver Münzer
1999: Werner Edler-Muhr
2000: Mario Handle
2001: Sebastian Resch
2002: Sebastian Resch
2003: Sebastian Resch
2004: Daniel Spitzl
2005: Georg Mlynek
2006: Andreas Rapatz

1500 metres
1960: Rudolf Klaban
1961: Rudolf Klaban
1962: Rudolf Klaban
1963: Rudolf Klaban
1964: Rudolf Klaban
1965: Rudolf Klaban
1966: Rudolf Klaban
1967: Rudolf Klaban
1968: Rudolf Klaban
1969: Heinrich Händlhuber
1970: Heinrich Händlhuber
1971: Walter Grabul
1972: Peter Rettenbacher
1973: Dietmar Millonig
1974: Herbert Tschernitz
1975: Peter Lindtner
1976: Dietmar Millonig
1977: Peter Lindtner
1978: Dietmar Millonig
1979: Dietmar Millonig
1980: 
1981: Robert Nemeth
1982: Robert Nemeth
1983: Robert Nemeth
1984: Robert Nemeth
1985: Robert Nemeth
1986: Karl Blaha
1987: Karl Blaha
1988: Karl Blaha
1989: Karl Blaha
1990: Karl Blaha
1991: Werner Edler-Muhr
1992: Werner Edler-Muhr
1993: Bernhard Richter
1994: Werner Edler-Muhr
1995: Thomas Ebner
1996: Thomas Ebner
1997: Werner Edler-Muhr
1998: Bernhard Richter
1999: Günther Weidlinger
2000: Günther Weidlinger
2001: Roland Waldner
2002: Sebastian Resch
2003: Daniel Spitzl
2004: Daniel Spitzl
2005: Daniel Spitzl
2006: Daniel Spitzl

5000 metres
1960: Laszlo Tanay
1961: Walter Steinbach
1962: Horst Gansel
1963: Horst Gansel
1964: Horst Gansel
1965: Manfred Wicher
1966: Rudolf Klaban
1967: Rudolf Klaban
1968: Rudolf Klaban
1969: Heinrich Händlhuber
1970: Hans Müller
1971: Hubert Millonig
1972: Josef Steiner
1973: Heinrich Händlhuber
1974: Heinrich Händlhuber
1975: Dietmar Millonig
1976: Dietmar Millonig
1977: Dietmar Millonig
1978: Erwin Wagger
1979: Erwin Wagger
1980: Dietmar Millonig
1981: Dietmar Millonig
1982: Dietmar Millonig
1983: Dietmar Millonig
1984: Dietmar Millonig
1985: Gerhard Hartmann
1986: Gerhard Hartmann
1987: Gerhard Hartmann
1988: Dietmar Millonig
1989: Gerhard Hartmann
1990: Dietmar Millonig
1991: Dietmar Millonig
1992: Dietmar Millonig
1993: Michael Buchleitner
1994: Michael Buchleitner
1995: Michael Buchleitner
1996: Werner Edler-Muhr
1997: Harald Steindorfer
1998: Michael Buchleitner
1999: Harald Steindorfer
2000: Bernhard Richter
2001: Harald Steindorfer
2002: Harald Steindorfer
2003: Martin Pröll
2004: Günther Weidlinger
2005: Günther Weidlinger
2006: Martin Pröll

10,000 metres
1960: Karl Lackner
1961: Adolf Gruber
1962: Adolf Gruber
1963: Horst Gansel
1964: Ernst Stöckl
1965: Horst Gansel
1966: Horst Gansel
1967: Manfred Wicher
1968: Manfred Wicher
1969: Richard Fink
1970: Hans Müller
1971: Hans Müller
1972: Hans Müller
1973: Heinrich Händlhuber
1974: Heinrich Händlhuber
1975: Peter Lindtner
1976: Heinrich Glas
1977: Josef Steiner
1978: Erwin Wagger
1979: Dietmar Millonig
1980: Dietmar Millonig
1981: Dietmar Millonig
1982: Dietmar Millonig
1983: Hannes Gruber
1984: Dietmar Millonig
1985: Dietmar Millonig
1986: Robert Nemeth
1987: Robert Nemeth
1988: Gerhard Hartmann
1989: Gerhard Hartmann
1990: Helmut Schmuck
1991: Dietmar Millonig
1992: Gerhard Hartmann
1993: Dietmar Millonig
1994: Robert Platzer
1995: Helmut Schenk
1996: Terefe Mekonen
1997: Michael Buchleitner
1998: Harald Steindorfer
1999: Harald Steindorfer
2000: Bernhard Richter
2001: Harald Steindorfer
2002: Harald Steindorfer
2003: Günther Weidlinger
2004: Günther Weidlinger
2005: Günther Weidlinger
2006: Martin Pröll

10K run
2005: Günther Weidlinger
2006: Günther Weidlinger

Half marathon
1992: Dietmar Millonig
1993: Helmut Schmuck
1994: Max Wenisch
1995: Michael Buchleitner
1996: Max Wenisch
1997: Michael Buchleitner
1998: Christian Pflügl
1999: Robert Platzer
2000: Roman Weger
2001: Roman Weger
2002: Roman Weger
2003: Harald Steindorfer
2004: Markus Hohenwarter
2005: Markus Hohenwarter

25K run
1960: Adolf Gruber
1961: Adolf Gruber
1962: Ernst Stöckl
1963: Ernst Stöckl
1964: Hans Sluzak
1965: Adolf Gruber
1966: Hans Sluzak
1967: Georg Förster
1968: Gero Grabenwarter
1969: Heinz Keminger
1970: Josef Hagen
1971: Richard Fink
1972: Georg Förster
1973: Hans Müller
1974: Richard Fink
1975: Richard Fink
1976: Heinrich Händlhuber
1977: Ignaz Waude
1978: Heinrich Händlhuber
1979: Josef Steiner
1980: Peter Pfeifenberger
1981: Gerhard Hartmann
1982: Gerhard Hartmann
1983: Gerhard Hartmann
1984: Hannes Gruber
1985: Hansjörg Randl
1986: Dietmar Millonig
1987: Peter Schatz
1988: Helmut Schmuck
1989: Helmut Schmuck
1990: Helmut Schmuck
1991: Dietmar Millonig

Marathon
1960: Adolf Gruber
1961: Adolf Gruber
1962: Adolf Gruber
1963: Adolf Gruber
1964: Helmut Richter
1965: Helmut Richter
1966: Helmut Richter
1967: Georg Förster
1968: Georg Förster
1969: Georg Förster
1970: Georg Förster
1971: Georg Förster
1972: Hans Müller
1973: Georg Förster
1974: Georg Förster
1975: Richard Fink
1976: Franz Pumhösl
1977: Ignaz Waude
1978: Martin Köhler
1979: Josef Steiner
1980: Balthasar Praschberger
1981: Josef Steiner
1982: Hubert Haas
1983: Gottfried Neuwirth
1984: Gerhard Hartmann
1985: Peter Schatz
1986: Hansjörg Randl
1987: Gerhard Hartmann
1988: Horst Röthel
1989: Erich Kokaly
1990: Helmut Schmuck
1991: Rolf Theuer
1992: Gerhard Hartmann
1993: Peter Pfeifenberger
1994: Max Wenisch
1995: Max Wenisch
1996: Max Wenisch
1997: Christian Kremslehner
1998: Harald Bauer
1999: Nicolas Salinger
2000: Max Wenisch
2001: Roman Weger
2002: Max Wenisch
2003: Michael Buchleitner
2004: Roman Weger
2005: Erich Kokaly
2006: Roman Weger

3000 metres steeplechase
1960: Walter Steinbach
1961: Walter Steinbach
1962: Horst Gansel
1963: Horst Gansel
1964: Horst Gansel
1965: Manfred Wicher
1966: Manfred Wicher
1967: Manfred Wicher
1968: Manfred Wicher
1969: Peter Rettenbacher
1970: Hans Müller
1971: Hans Müller
1972: Fritz Käfer
1973: Peter Lindtner
1974: Peter Lindtner
1975: Peter Lindtner
1976: Peter Lindtner
1977: Peter Lindtner
1978: Wolfgang Konrad
1979: Wolfgang Konrad
1980: Wolfgang Konrad
1981: Peter Pfeifenberger
1982: Wolfgang Konrad
1983: Hannes Gruber
1984: Hannes Gruber
1985: Wolfgang Konrad
1986: Wolfgang Konrad
1987: Peter Pfeifenberger
1988: Wolfgang Fritz
1989: Wolfgang Fritz
1990: Michael Buchleitner
1991: Wolfgang Fritz
1992: Michael Buchleitner
1993: Hans Funder
1994: Hans Funder
1995: Hans Funder
1996: Eugen Song
1997: Günther Weidlinger
1998: Günther Weidlinger
1999: Günther Weidlinger
2000: Georg Mlynek
2001: Georg Mlynek
2002: Martin Pröll
2003: Günther Weidlinger
2004: Martin Pröll
2005: Martin Pröll
2006: Günther Weidlinger

110 metres hurdles
1960: Reinhold Flaschberger
1961: Hans Muchitsch
1962: Konrad Lerch
1963: Helmut Haid
1964: Helmut Haid
1965: Gunter Zikeli
1966: Gunter Zikeli
1967: Horst Mandl
1968: Horst Mandl
1969: Horst Mandl
1970: Gert Herunter
1971: Klaus Potsch
1972: Klaus Potsch
1973: Armin Vilas
1974: Sepp Zeilbauer
1975: Armin Vilas
1976: Armin Vilas
1977: Armin Vilas
1978: Sepp Zeilbauer
1979: Sepp Zeilbauer
1980: Herbert Kreiner
1981: Herbert Kreiner
1982: Herbert Kreiner
1983: Herbert Kreiner
1984: Herbert Kreiner
1985: Kurt Kriegler
1986: Thomas Weimann
1987: Norbert Tomaschek
1988: Thomas Weimann
1989: Thomas Weimann
1990: Hubert Petz
1991: Herwig Röttl
1992: Herwig Röttl
1993: Christian Maislinger
1994: Mark McKoy
1995: Herwig Röttl
1996: Christian Maislinger
1997: Elmar Lichtenegger
1998: Elmar Lichtenegger
1999: Elmar Lichtenegger
2000: Elmar Lichtenegger
2001: Elmar Lichtenegger
2002: Elmar Lichtenegger
2003: Leo Hudec
2004: Leo Hudec
2005: Elmar Lichtenegger
2006: Elmar Lichtenegger

200 metres hurdles
1961: Helmut Haid
1962: Helmut Haid
1963: Helmut Haid
1964: Helmut Haid
1965: Gert Herunter

400 metres hurdles
1960: Hans Muchitsch
1961: Helmut Haid
1962: Helmut Haid
1963: Helmut Haid
1964: Helmut Haid
1965: Helmut Haid
1966: Robert Kropiunik
1967: Helmut Haid
1968: Helmut Haid
1969: Helmut Haid
1970: Robert Kropiunik
1971: Helmut Haid
1972: Helmut Haid
1973: Gert Weinhandl
1974: Gert Weinhandl
1975: Gert Weinhandl
1976: Gert Weinhandl
1977: Felix Rümmele
1978: Felix Rümmele
1979: Felix Rümmele
1980: Felix Rümmele
1981: Felix Rümmele
1982: Herbert Kreiner
1983: Thomas Futterknecht
1984: Thomas Futterknecht
1985: Thomas Futterknecht
1986: Thomas Futterknecht
1987: Klaus Ehrle
1988: Klaus Ehrle
1989: Klaus Ehrle
1990: Klaus Ehrle
1991: Klaus Ehrle
1992: Peter Knoll
1993: Andreas Rapek
1994: Peter Knoll
1995: Peter Knoll
1996: Peter Knoll
1997: Peter Knoll
1998: Karl Lang
1999: Karl Lang
2000: Karl Lang
2001: Karl Lang
2002: Karl Lang
2003: Karl Lang
2004: Ralf Hegny
2005: Gotthard Schöpf
2006: Gotthard Schöpf

High jump
1960: Helmut Donner
1961: Helmut Donner
1962: Walter Schwimbersky
1963: Helmut Donner
1964: Helmut Donner
1965: Helmut Donner
1966: Herbert Janko
1967: Herbert Janko
1968: Herbert Janko
1969: Wolfgang Steinbach
1970: Horst Mandl
1971: Hans Crepaz
1972: Walter Gurker
1973: Horst Mandl
1974: Wolfgang Tschirk
1975: Wolfgang Tschirk
1976: Wolfgang Tschirk
1977: Wolfgang Tschirk
1978: Wolfgang Tschirk
1979: Wolfgang Tschirk
1980: Wolfgang Tschirk
1981: Wolfgang Tschirk
1982: Wolfgang Tschirk
1983: Wolfgang Tschirk
1984: Wolfgang Tschirk
1985: Markus Einberger
1986: Gottfried Wittgruber
1987: Markus Einberger
1988: Markus Einberger
1989: Markus Einberger
1990: Wolfgang Tschirk
1991: Wolfgang Tschirk
1992: Niki Grundner
1993: Niki Grundner
1994: Pavel Vanicek
1995: Günther Gasper
1996: Pavel Vanicek
1997: Pavel Vanicek
1998: Erwin Reiterer
1999: Pavel Vanicek
2000: Pavel Vanicek
2001: Günther Gasper
2002: Pavel Vanicek
2003: Pavel Vanicek
2004: Günther Gasper
2005: Pavel Vanicek
2006: Martin Kalss

Pole vault
1960: Karl Bauer
1961: Karl Bauer
1962: Günther Gratzer
1963: Günther Gratzer
1964: Günther Gratzer
1965: Karl Bauer
1966: Ingo Peyker
1967: Peter Zwerger
1968: Ingo Peyker
1969: Peter Zwerger
1970: Peter Fieber
1971: Ingo Peyker
1972: Ingo Peyker
1973: Ingo Peyker
1974: Lukas Rettenbacher
1975: Sepp Zeilbauer
1976: Sepp Zeilbauer
1977: Gerhard Parger
1978: Reinhard Lechner
1979: Lukas Rettenbacher
1980: Reinhard Lechner
1981: Reinhard Lechner
1982: Hermann Fehringer
1983: Hermann Fehringer
1984: Hermann Fehringer
1985: Gerald Kager
1986: Hermann Fehringer
1987: Hermann Fehringer
1988: Gerald Kager
1989: Hermann Fehringer
1990: Hermann Fehringer
1991: Hermann Fehringer
1992: Martin Tischler
1993: Martin Tischler
1994: Hermann Fehringer
1995: Hermann Fehringer
1996: Hermann Fehringer
1997: Stefan Klein & Markus Volek
1998: Martin Seer
1999: Martin Seer
2000: Martin Tischler
2001: Martin Tischler
2002: Martin Tischler
2003: Thomas Ager
2004: Thomas Tebbich
2005: Thomas Ager
2006: Thomas Ager

Long jump
1960: Hans Muchitsch
1961: Hans Muchitsch
1962: Horst Mandl
1963: Gerhard Mmaschek
1964: Horst Mandl
1965: Horst Mandl
1966: Horst Mandl
1967: Ingo Peyker
1968: Ingo Peyker
1969: Gerald Weixelbaumer
1970: Ingo Peyker
1971: Gerald Herzig
1972: Gerald Weixelbaumer
1973: Helmut Matzner
1974: Helmut Matzner
1975: Helmut Matzner
1976: Alexander Leitner
1977: Georg Werthner
1978: Werner Prenner
1979: Gerald Herzig
1980: William Rea
1981: Werner Prenner
1982: Gerald Kager
1983: Werner Prenner
1984: Alfred Stummer
1985: Alfred Stummer
1986: Teddy Steinmayr
1987: Andreas Steiner
1988: Andreas Steiner
1989: Teddy Steinmayr
1990: Teddy Steinmayr
1991: Teddy Steinmayr
1992: Teddy Steinmayr
1993: Teddy Steinmayr
1994: Manfred Auinger
1995: Teddy Steinmayr
1996: Martin Löbel
1997: Martin Löbel
1998: Martin Löbel
1999: Harald Weiser
2000: Daniel Hagspiel
2001: Martin Löbel
2002: Isagani Peychär
2003: Roland Schwarzl
2004: Isagani Peychär
2005: Isagani Peychär
2006: Csaba Szekely

Triple jump
1960: Wolfgang Feketeföldi
1961: Heinrich Batik
1962: Heinrich Batik
1963: Werner Vonblon
1964: Horst Mandl
1965: Horst Mandl
1966: Horst Mandl
1967: Horst Mandl
1968: Horst Mandl
1969: Horst Mandl
1970: Horst Mandl
1971: Horst Mandl
1972: Horst Mandl
1973: Helmut Matzner
1974: Helmut Matzner
1975: Helmut Matzner
1976: Heinrich Libal
1977: Georg Werthner
1978: Heinrich Libal
1979: Georg Werthner
1980: Georg Werthner
1981: Harald Florian
1982: Georg Werthner
1983: Adolf Ronge
1984: Alfred Stummer
1985: Alfred Stummer
1986: Alfred Stummer
1987: Alfred Stummer
1988: Alfred Stummer
1989: Alfred Stummer
1990: Alfred Stummer
1991: Alfred Stummer
1992: Alfred Stummer
1993: Alfred Stummer
1994: Michael Mayrhofer
1995: Alfred Stummer
1996: Klaus Biberauer
1997: Boris Bjanov
1998: Klaus Biberauer
1999: Boris Bjanov
2000: Boris Bjanov
2001: Boris Bjanov
2002: Klaus Biberauer
2003: Klaus Biberauer
2004: Klaus Biberauer
2005: Michael Mölschl
2006: Csaba Szekely

Shot put
1960: Alfred Tucek
1961: Hans Pötsch
1962: Werner Ehrlich
1963: Heimo Reinitzer
1964: Ernst Soudek
1965: Hannes Schulze-Bauer
1966: Hans Pötsch
1967: Hans Pötsch
1968: Hans Pötsch
1969: Hannes Schulze-Bauer
1970: Hans Pötsch
1971: Hannes Schulze-Bauer
1972: Heimo Reinitzer
1973: Hannes Schulze-Bauer
1974: Hermann Neudolt
1975: Wolf Bialonczyk
1976: Hermann Neudolt
1977: Hermann Neudolt
1978: Hermann Neudolt
1979: Erwin Weitzl
1980: Erwin Weitzl
1981: Erwin Weitzl
1982: Erwin Weitzl
1983: Erwin Weitzl
1984: Erwin Weitzl
1985: Erwin Weitzl
1986: Erwin Weitzl
1987: Klaus Bodenmüller
1988: Erwin Weitzl
1989: Klaus Bodenmüller
1990: Christian Nebl
1991: Klaus Bodenmüller
1992: Klaus Bodenmüller
1993: Klaus Bodenmüller
1994: Christian Nebl
1995: Christian Nebl
1996: Christian Nebl
1997: Andreas Vlasny
1998: Erwin Pirklbauer
1999: Andreas Vlasny
2000: Erwin Pirklbauer
2001: Andreas Vlasny
2002: Erwin Pirklbauer
2003: Erwin Pirklbauer
2004: Gerhard Zillner
2005: Gerhard Zillner
2006: Martin Gratzer

Discus throw
1960: Herbert Egermann
1961: Herbert Egermann
1962: Herbert Egermann
1963: Heimo Reinitzer
1964: Ernst Soudek
1965: Heimo Reinitzer
1966: Heimo Reinitzer
1967: Ernst Soudek
1968: Heimo Reinitzer
1969: Hans Matous
1970: Heimo Reinitzer
1971: Heimo Reinitzer
1972: Heimo Reinitzer
1973: Hans Matous
1974: Hans Matous
1975: Hans Matous
1976: Hans Matous
1977: Hans Matous
1978: Hans Matous
1979: Georg Frank
1980: Erwin Weitzl
1981: Georg Frank
1982: Arno Rupp
1983: Erwin Weitzl
1984: Arno Rupp
1985: Arno Rupp
1986: Erwin Weitzl
1987: Erwin Weitzl
1988: Erwin Weitzl
1989: Erwin Weitzl
1990: Erwin Weitzl
1991: Alfred Ramler
1992: Erwin Pirklbauer
1993: Erwin Pirklbauer
1994: Erwin Pirklbauer
1995: Erwin Pirklbauer
1996: Erwin Pirklbauer
1997: Erwin Pirklbauer
1998: Erwin Pirklbauer
1999: Erwin Pirklbauer
2000: Erwin Pirklbauer
2001: Gerhard Mayer
2002: Gerhard Mayer
2003: Gerhard Mayer
2004: Gerhard Mayer
2005: Gerhard Mayer
2006: Gerhard Mayer

Hammer throw
1960: Heinrich Thun
1961: Heinrich Thun
1962: Heinrich Thun
1963: Heinrich Thun
1964: Heinrich Thun
1965: Klaus Winter
1966: Heinrich Thun
1967: Hans Pötsch
1968: Hans Pötsch
1969: Hans Pötsch
1970: Hans Pötsch
1971: Hans Pötsch
1972: Peter Sternad
1973: Peter Sternad
1974: Peter Sternad
1975: Peter Sternad
1976: Peter Sternad
1977: Heimo Viertbauer
1978: Peter Sternad
1979: Peter Sternad
1980: Peter Sternad
1981: Johann Lindner
1982: Johann Lindner
1983: Johann Lindner
1984: Johann Lindner
1985: Johann Lindner
1986: Johann Lindner
1987: Johann Lindner
1988: Johann Lindner
1989: Johann Lindner
1990: Johann Lindner
1991: Johann Lindner
1992: Johann Lindner
1993: Johann Lindner
1994: Johann Lindner
1995: Walter Edletitsch
1996: Walter Edletitsch
1997: Walter Edletitsch
1998: Walter Edletitsch
1999: Walter Edletitsch
2000: Walter Edletitsch
2001: Walter Edletitsch
2002: Walter Edletitsch
2003: Walter Edletitsch
2004: Benjamin Siart
2005: Benjamin Siart
2006: Benjamin Siart

Javelin throw
1960: Franz Deboeuf
1961: Franz Löberbauer
1962: Franz Löberbauer
1963: Franz Löberbauer
1964: Walter Pektor
1965: Walter Pektor
1966: Walter Pektor
1967: Walter Pektor
1968: Walter Pektor
1969: Helmut Schönbichler
1970: Helmut Schönbichler
1971: Walter Pektor
1972: Karl Pregl
1973: Helmut Schönbichler
1974: Walter Pektor
1975: Walter Pektor
1976: Walter Pektor
1977: Wilhelm Malle
1978: Wilhelm Malle
1979: Georg Werthner
1980: Georg Werthner
1981: Georg Werthner
1982: Karl Pregl
1983: Georg Werthner
1984: Georg Werthner
1985: Wolfgang Spann
1986: Otto Petrovic
1987: Wolfgang Spann
1988: Georg Werthner
1989: Otto Petrovic
1990: Otto Petrovic
1991: Otto Petrovic
1992: Thomas Pichler
1993: Gregor Högler
1994: Gregor Högler
1995: Gregor Högler
1996: Gregor Högler
1997: Gregor Högler
1998: Gregor Högler
1999: Gregor Högler
2000: Gregor Högler
2001: Gregor Högler
2002: Gregor Högler
2003: Gregor Högler
2004: Max Linher
2005: Klaus Ambrosch
2006: Gregor Högler

Pentathlon
1960: Franz Löberbauer
1961: Herbert Egermann
1962: Franz Löberbauer
1963: Manfred Wicher
1964: Peter Schober
1965: Anselm Urbanek
1966: Robert Kropiunik
1967: Horst Mandl
1968: Horst Mandl
1969: Rainer Desch
1970: Rainer Desch
1971: Sepp Zeilbauer
1972: Rainer Desch

Decathlon
1960: Hans Muchitsch
1961: Hans Muchitsch
1962: Hans Muchitsch
1963: Horst Mandl
1964: Horst Mandl
1965: Horst Mandl
1966: Ingo Peyker
1967: Ingo Peyker
1968: Gert Herunter
1969: Horst Mandl
1970: Horst Mandl
1971: Horst Mandl
1972: Ingo Peyker
1973: Sepp Zeilbauer
1974: Sepp Zeilbauer
1975: Georg Werthner
1976: Sepp Zeilbauer
1977: Georg Werthner
1978: Sepp Zeilbauer
1979: Georg Werthner
1980: Georg Werthner
1981: Sepp Zeilbauer
1982: Georg Werthner
1983: Wolfgang Spann
1984: Georg Werthner
1985: Jürgen Mandl
1986: Georg Werthner
1987: Michael Arnold
1988: Georg Werthner
1989: Gernot Kellermayr
1990: Michael Arnold
1991: Erwin Reiterer
1992: Martin Krenn
1993: Leo Hudec
1994: Leo Hudec
1995: Gerhard Röser
1996: Thomas Tebbich
1997: Thomas Tebbich
1998: Klaus Ambrosch
1999: Klaus Ambrosch
2000: Thomas Lorber
2001: Markus Walser
2002: Klaus Ambrosch
2003: Roland Schwarzl
2004: Thomas Tebbich
2005: Markus Walser

10,000 metres walk
1975: Wolfgang Burgstaller
1976: Wolfgang Burgstaller
1977: Wolfgang Burgstaller
1978: Johann Siegele
1979: Martin Toporek
1980: Martin Toporek

20 kilometres walk
The course for the 2002 event was one kilometre too long.
1977: Wolfgang Burgstaller
1978: Johann Siegele
1979: Wilfried Siegele
1980: Wilfried Siegele
1981: Martin Toporek
1982: Martin Toporek
1983: Martin Toporek
1984: Martin Toporek
1985: Martin Toporek
1986: Martin Toporek
1987: Martin Toporek
1988: Stephan Wögerbauer
1989: Stephan Wögerbauer
1990: Martin Toporek
1991: Martin Toporek
1992: Stephan Wögerbauer
1993: Stephan Wögerbauer
1994: Stephan Wögerbauer
1995: Stephan Wögerbauer
1996: Stephan Wögerbauer
1997: Stephan Wögerbauer
1998: Stephan Wögerbauer
1999: Stephan Wögerbauer
2000: Stephan Wögerbauer
2001: Stephan Wögerbauer
2002: Stephan Wögerbauer
2003: Stephan Wögerbauer
2004: Norbert Jung
2005: Norbert Jung
2006: Norbert Jung

50 kilometres walk
1980: Johann Siegele
1981: Wilfried Siegele
1982: Wilfried Siegele
1983: Wilfried Siegele
1984: Wilfried Siegele
1985: Johann Siegele
1986: Wilfried Siegele
1987: Stephan Wögerbauer
1988: Stephan Wögerbauer
1989: Stephan Wögerbauer
1990: Stephan Wögerbauer
1991: Martin Toporek
1992: Stephan Wögerbauer
1993: Stephan Wögerbauer
1994: Stephan Wögerbauer
1995: Stephan Wögerbauer
1996: Stephan Wögerbauer
1997: Stephan Wögerbauer
1998: Stephan Wögerbauer
1999: Stephan Wögerbauer
2000: Stephan Wögerbauer
2001: Stephan Wögerbauer
2002: Stephan Wögerbauer
2003: Stephan Wögerbauer
2004: Stephan Wögerbauer
2005: Dietmar Hirschmugl

Cross country (long course)
1960: Karl Lackner
1961: Karl Lackner
1962: Karl Lackner
1963: Horst Gansel
1964: Horst Gansel
1965: Horst Gansel
1966: Horst Gansel
1967: Hans Berger
1968: Manfred Wicher
1969: Hans Müller
1970: Hans Müller
1971: Hans Müller
1972: Hans Müller
1973: Hans Müller
1974: Richard Fink
1975: Dietmar Millonig
1976: Josef Steiner
1977: Heinrich Händlhuber
1978: Dietmar Millonig
1979: Dietmar Millonig
1980: Dietmar Millonig
1981: Gerhard Hartmann
1982: Gerhard Hartmann
1983: Gerhard Hartmann
1984: Gerhard Hartmann
1985: Gerhard Hartmann
1986: Gerhard Hartmann
1987: Gerhard Hartmann
1988: Gerhard Hartmann
1989: Gerhard Hartmann
1990: Gerhard Hartmann
1991: Gerhard Hartmann
1992: Gerhard Hartmann
1993: Dietmar Millonig
1994: Michael Buchleitner
1995: Helmut Schmuck
1996: Helmut Schmuck
1997: Michael Buchleitner
1998: Michael Buchleitner
1999: Helmut Schmuck
2000: Michael Buchleitner
2001: Günther Weidlinger
2002: Michael Buchleitner
2003: Günther Weidlinger
2004: Christian Pflügl
2005: Günther Weidlinger
2006: Günther Weidlinger

Cross country (short course)
1960: Laszlo Tanay
1961: Walter Steinbach
1962: Volker Tulzer
1963: Volker Tulzer
1964: Manfred Wicher
1965: Volker Tulzer
1966: Volker Tulzer
1967: Rudolf Klaban
1968: Heinrich Händlhuber
1969: Kurt Mayer
1970: Franz Graf
1971: Heinrich Händlhuber
1972: Herbert Tschernitz
1973: Heinrich Händlhuber
1974: Heinrich Händlhuber
1975: Heinrich Händlhuber
1976: Peter Lindtner
1977: Peter Lindtner
1978: Peter Lindtner
1979: Wolfgang Konrad
1980: Wolfgang Konrad
1981: Robert Nemeth
1982: Robert Nemeth
1983: Hannes Gruber
1984: Robert Nemeth
1985: Wolfgang Konrad
1986: Dietmar Millonig
1987: Robert Nemeth
1988: Wolfgang Konrad
1989: Thomas Fahringer
1990: Helmut Schmuck
1991: Michael Buchleitner & Bernhard Richter
1992: Bernhard Richter
1993: Bernhard Richter
1994: Bernhard Richter
1995: Bernhard Richter
1996: Wolfgang Fritz
1997: Thomas Ebner
1998: Günther Weidlinger
1999: Christian Pflügl
2000: Günther Weidlinger
2001: Günther Weidlinger
2002: Günther Weidlinger
2003: Günther Weidlinger
2004: Günther Weidlinger
2005: Günther Weidlinger
2006: Günther Weidlinger

Mountain running
1984: Erich Ammann
1985: Helmut Stuhlpfarrer
1986: Helmut Stuhlpfarrer
1987: Peter Schatz
1988: Helmut Schmuck
1989: Florian Stern
1990: Helmut Stuhlpfarrer
1991: Helmut Schmuck
1992: Karl Zisser
1993: Helmut Schmuck
1994: Helmut Schmuck
1995: Helmut Schmuck
1996: Helmut Schmuck
1997: Peter Schatz
1998: Helmut Schmuck
1999: Helmut Schmuck
2000: Helmut Schmuck
2001: Helmut Schmuck
2002: Alois Redl
2003: Helmut Schmuck
2004: Helmut Schmuck
2005: Florian Heinzle
2006: Alexander Rieder

Women

100 metres
1960: Ulla Flegel
1961: Monika Kager
1962: Dorli Tischner
1963: Heidi Lechleuthner
1964: Inge Aigner
1965: Helga Kapfer
1966: Helga Kapfer
1967: Helga Kapfer
1968: Inge Aigner
1969: Erika Kren
1970: Brigitte Ortner
1971: Helga Kapfer
1972: Karoline Käfer
1973: Karoline Käfer
1974: Karoline Käfer
1975: Karoline Käfer
1976: Brigitte Haest
1977: Karoline Käfer
1978: Karoline Käfer
1979: Brigitte Haest
1980: Karoline Käfer
1981: Petra Prenner
1982: Ingeborg Brüstle
1983: Karoline Käfer
1984: Sabine Seitl
1985: Gerda Haas
1986: Gerda Haas
1987: Elisabeth Norz
1988: Sabine Seitl
1989: Sabine Tröger
1990: Sabine Tröger
1991: Sabine Tröger
1992: Sabine Tröger
1993: Sabine Tröger
1994: Sabine Tröger
1995: Sabine Kirchmaier
1996: Sabine Kirchmaier
1997: Karin Mayr-Krifka
1998: Karin Mayr-Krifka
1999: Karin Mayr-Krifka
2000: Karin Mayr-Krifka
2001: Bettina Müller-Weissina
2002: Karin Mayr-Krifka
2003: Karin Mayr-Krifka
2004: Bettina Müller-Weissina
2005: Karin Mayr-Krifka
2006: Bettina Müller-Weissina

200 metres
1960: Grete Bosnyak
1961: Erna Auer
1962: Monika Kager
1963: Heidi Lechleuthner
1964: Inge Aigner
1965: Inge Aigner
1966: Helga Kapfer
1967: Inge Aigner
1968: Inge Aigner
1969: Helga Kapfer
1970: Helga Kapfer
1971: Helga Kapfer
1972: Karoline Käfer
1973: Karoline Käfer
1974: Karoline Käfer
1975: Karoline Käfer
1976: Christiane Wildschek
1977: Karoline Käfer
1978: Karoline Käfer
1979: Karoline Käfer
1980: Karoline Käfer
1981: Elisabeth Petutschnig
1982: Elisabeth Petutschnig
1983: Karoline Käfer
1984: Grace Pardy
1985: Gerda Haas
1986: Gerda Haas
1987: Gerda Haas
1988: Gerda Haas
1989: Sabine Tröger
1990: Sabine Tröger
1991: Sabine Tröger
1992: Sabine Tröger
1993: Sabine Tröger
1994: Sabine Tröger
1995: Sabine Kirchmaier
1996: Sabine Kirchmaier
1997: Karin Mayr-Krifka
1998: Stefanie Hollweger
1999: Sabine Mick
2000: Karin Mayr-Krifka
2001: Bianca Dürr
2002: Karin Mayr-Krifka
2003: Karin Mayr-Krifka
2004: Karin Mayr-Krifka
2005: Karin Mayr-Krifka
2006: Doris Röser

400 metres
1961: Maria Pfeiffer
1962: Maria Pfeiffer
1963: Bärbl Schatz
1964: Bärbl Schatz
1965: Bärbl Schatz
1966: Barbara Kulhanek
1967: Maria Sykora
1968: Maria Sykora
1969: Maria Sykora
1970: Maria Sykora
1971: Maria Sykora
1972: Karoline Käfer
1973: Karoline Käfer
1974: Karoline Käfer
1975: Karoline Käfer
1976: Christiane Wildschek
1977: Karoline Käfer
1978: Silvia Schinzel
1979: Karoline Käfer
1980: Karoline Käfer
1981: Elisabeth Petutschnig
1982: Karoline Käfer
1983: Karoline Käfer
1984: Gerda Haas
1985: Gerda Haas
1986: Gerda Haas
1987: Gerda Haas
1988: Gerda Haas
1989: Gerda Haas
1990: Gerda Haas
1991: Sabine Tröger
1992: Sabine Tröger
1993: Andrea Pospischek
1994: Stefanie Zotter
1995: Stefanie Zotter
1996: Sabine Kirchmaier
1997: Stephanie Graf
1998: Stephanie Graf
1999: Stephanie Graf
2000: Stephanie Graf
2001: Betina Germann
2002: Sabine Gasselseder
2003: Stephanie Graf
2004: Viktoria Steinmüller
2005: Sabine Kreiner
2006: Betina Germann

800 metres
1960: Gaby Scholtes
1961: Maria Pfeiffer
1962: Bärbl Schatz
1963: Bärbl Schatz
1964: Bärbl Schatz
1965: Bärbl Schatz
1966: Hanna Biba
1967: Bärbl Schatz
1968: Maria Sykora
1969: Maria Sykora
1970: Sissy Brandnegger
1971: Maria Sykora
1972: Maria Sykora
1973: Christiane Wildschek
1974: Rita Graf
1975: Angelika Schrott
1976: Andrea Mühlbach
1977: Andrea Mühlbach
1978: Christiane Wildschek
1979: Christiane Wildschek
1980: Christiane Wildschek
1981: Anni Müller
1982: Doris Weilharter
1983: Marion Reiter
1984: Karoline Käfer
1985: Karoline Käfer
1986: Karoline Käfer
1987: Erika Zenz
1988: Ernestine Waldhör
1989: Theresia Kiesl
1990: Theresia Kiesl
1991: Theresia Kiesl
1992: Theresia Kiesl
1993: Theresia Kiesl
1994: Stephanie Graf
1995: Stephanie Graf
1996: Stephanie Graf
1997: Stephanie Graf
1998: Brigitte Mühlbacher
1999: Karin Walkner
2000: Brigitte Mühlbacher
2001: Brigitte Mühlbacher
2002: Brigitte Mühlbacher
2003: Brigitte Mühlbacher
2004: Elisabeth Niedereder
2005: Elisabeth Niedereder
2006: Pamela Märzendorfer

1500 metres
1971: Friederike Schmid
1972: Angelika Schrott
1973: Doris Weilharter
1974: Angelika Schrott
1975: Angelika Schrott
1976: Anni Klemenjak
1977: Doris Weilharter
1978: Anni Klemenjak
1979: Anni Klemenjak
1980: Christiane Wildschek
1981: Doris Weilharter
1982: Doris Weilharter
1983: Doris Weilharter
1984: Anni Müller
1985: Anni Müller
1986: Anni Müller
1987: Anni Müller
1988: Erika Zenz
1989: Theresia Kiesl
1990: Erika Zenz
1991: Theresia Kiesl
1992: Theresia Kiesl
1993: Stephanie Graf
1994: Stephanie Graf
1995: Theresia Kiesl
1996: Brigitte Mühlbacher
1997: Theresia Kiesl
1998: Brigitte Mühlbacher
1999: Brigitte Mühlbacher
2000: Susanne Pumper
2001: Martina Winter
2002: Brigitte Mühlbacher
2003: Susanne Pumper
2004: Susanne Pumper
2005: Susanne Pumper
2006: Silvia Aschenberger

3000 metres
1973: Anni Klemenjak
1974: Doris Weilharter
1975: Angelika Schrott
1976: Doris Weilharter
1977: Anni Klemenjak
1978: Anni Klemenjak
1979: Doris Weilharter
1980: Anni Müller
1981: Doris Weilharter
1982: Doris Weilharter
1983: Anni Müller
1984: Anni Müller
1985: Anni Müller
1986: Anni Müller
1987: Anni Müller
1988: Anni Müller
1989: Anni Müller
1990: Anni Müller
1991: Erika König-Zenz
1992: Elisabeth Singer
1993: Erika König-Zenz
1994: Erika König-Zenz
1995: Sandra Baumann

5000 metres
1983: Anni Müller
1984: Anni Müller
1985: Not held
1986: Not held
1987: Not held
1988: Not held
1989: Not held
1990: Not held
1991: Not held
1992: Not held
1993: Not held
1994: Not held
1995: Not held
1996: Susanne Pumper
1997: Susanne Pumper
1998: Susanne Pumper
1999: Susanne Pumper
2000: Sandra Baumann
2001: Susanne Pumper
2002: Sandra Baumann
2003: Helene Eidenberger
2004: Eva Maria Gradwohl
2005: Susanne Pumper
2006: Susanne Pumper

10,000 metres
1985: Anni Müller
1986: Carina Weber-Leutner
1987: Anni Müller
1988: Anni Müller
1989: Anni Müller
1990: Anni Müller
1991: Anni Müller
1992: Carina Weber-Leutner
1993: Susanne Fischer
1994: Carina Lilge-Leutner
1995: Sandra Baumann
1996: Anna Haderer
1997: Susanne Pumper
1998: Susanne Pumper
1999: Susanne Pumper
2000: Susanne Pumper
2001: Susanne Pumper
2002: Susanne Pumper
2003: Andrea Mayr
2004: Andrea Mayr
2005: Susanne Pumper
2006: Andrea Mayr

10K run
1983: Maria Springer
1984: Anni Müller
1985: Not held
1986: Not held
1987: Not held
1988: Not held
1989: Not held
1990: Not held
1991: Not held
1992: Not held
1993: Not held
1994: Not held
1995: Not held
1996: Not held
1997: Not held
1998: Not held
1999: Not held
2000: Not held
2001: Not held
2002: Not held
2003: Not held
2004: Not held
2005: Martina Winter
2006: Andrea Mayr

15K run
1985: Anni Müller
1986: Carina Weber-Leutner
1987: Verena Lechner
1988: Anni Müller
1989: Anni Müller
1990: Verena Lechner
1991: Carina Weber-Leutner

Half marathon
1992: Carina Weber-Leutner
1993: Elisabeth Rust
1994: Elisabeth Rust
1995: Carina Lilge-Leutner
1996: Anna Haderer
1997: Anna Haderer
1998: Ulrike Puchner
1999: Gudrun Pflüger
2000: Dagmar Rabensteiner
2001: Dagmar Rabensteiner
2002: Eva Maria Gradwohl
2003: Eva Maria Gradwohl
2004: Susanne Pumper
2005: Eva Maria Gradwohl

25K run
1980: Andrea Zirknitzer
1982: Edith Sappl

Marathon
1983: Monika Frisch
1984: Monika Naskau
1985: Monika Frisch
1986: Ida Hellwagner
1987: Carina Weber-Leutner
1988: Carina Quintero
1989: Elisabeth Singer
1990: Carina Weber-Leutner
1991: Carina Weber-Leutner
1992: Andrea Hofmann
1993: Carina Lilge-Leutner
1994: Andrea Hofmann
1995: Elisabeth Rust
1996: Anna Haderer
1997: Ulrike Puchner
1998: Elisabeth Rust
1999: Karoline Dohr
2000: Dagmar Rabensteiner
2001: Ulrike Puchner
2002: Veronika Kienbichl
2003: Eva Maria Gradwohl
2004: Ingrid Eichberger
2005: Eva Maria Gradwohl
2006: Susanne Pumper

3000 metres steeplechase
2001: Andrea Mayr
2002: Sandra Baumann
2003: Andrea Mayr
2004: Andrea Mayr
2005: Birgit Scheifinger
2006: Andrea Mayr

80 metres hurdles
1960: Gertrude Fries
1961: Friedl Murauer
1962: Ulla Flegel
1963: Anneliese Schwendenwein
1964: Inge Aigner
1965: Inge Aigner
1966: Traude Weberschläger
1967: Inge Aigner
1968: Inge Aigner

100 metres hurdles
1969: Liese Prokop
1970: Maria Sykora
1971: Doris Langhans
1972: Liese Prokop
1973: Doris Langhans
1974: Carmen Mähr
1975: Doris Langhans
1976: Carmen Pfanner
1977: Doris Mandl
1978: Petra Prenner
1979: Petra Prenner
1980: Petra Prenner
1981: Petra Prenner
1982: Petra Prenner
1983: Petra Prenner
1984: Sabine Seitl
1985: Sabine Seitl
1986: Sabine Seitl
1987: Ulrike Kleindl
1988: Sabine Seitl
1989: Sabine Seitl
1990: Ulrike Beierl
1991: Ulrike Beierl
1992: Gabriele Miklautsch
1993: Gabriele Miklautsch
1994: Elke Wölfling
1995: Karin Mayr-Krifka
1996: Elke Wölfling
1997: Elke Wölfling
1998: Elke Wölfling
1999: Elke Wölfling
2000: Elke Wölfling
2001: Daniela Wöckinger
2002: Daniela Wöckinger
2003: Elke Wölfling
2004: Lisi Maurer
2005: Daniela Wöckinger
2006: Lisi Maurer & Victoria Schreibeis

400 metres hurdles
1976: Christiane Wildschek
1977: Andrea Mühlbach
1978: Christiane Wildschek
1979: Eveline Ledl
1980: Eveline Ledl
1981: Eveline Ledl
1982: Elisabeth Petutschnig
1983: Melitta Aigner
1984: Gerda Haas
1985: Gerda Haas
1986: Gerda Haas
1987: Gerda Haas
1988: Gerda Haas
1989: Gerda Haas
1990: Gerda Haas
1991: Stefanie Zotter
1992: Tamara Striessnig
1993: Andrea Pospischek
1994: Stefanie Zotter
1995: Stefanie Zotter
1996: Zsuzsanna Petö
1997: Zsuzsanna Petö
1998: Daniela Graiani
1999: Barbara Röser
2000: Pamela Märzendorfer
2001: Sabine Gasselseder
2002: Sabine Gasselseder
2003: Sabine Gasselseder
2004: Sarah Baier
2005: Sabine Kreiner
2006: Sabine Kreiner

High jump
1960: Marianne Linser
1961: Liese Sykora
1962: Liese Sykora
1963: Liese Sykora
1964: Ulla Flegel
1965: Liese Prokop
1966: Ilona Majdan
1967: Ilona Gusenbauer
1968: Ilona Gusenbauer
1969: Ilona Gusenbauer
1970: Ilona Gusenbauer
1971: Ilona Gusenbauer
1972: Ilona Gusenbauer
1973: Ilona Gusenbauer
1974: Margit Danninger
1975: Ilona Gusenbauer
1976: Ilona Gusenbauer
1977: Riki Lechner
1978: Isabella Rohrbacher
1979: Helga Pargfrieder
1980: Melitta Aigner
1981: Sabine Skvara
1982: Sigrid Kirchmann
1983: Sigrid Kirchmann
1984: Sigrid Kirchmann
1985: Sabine Skvara
1986: Sigrid Kirchmann
1987: Sigrid Kirchmann
1988: Sigrid Kirchmann
1989: Ulrike Kotzina
1990: Sigrid Kirchmann
1991: Sigrid Kirchmann
1992: Monika Gollner
1993: Sigrid Kirchmann
1994: Sigrid Kirchmann
1995: Monika Gollner
1996: Monika Gollner
1997: Linda Horvath
1998: Monika Gollner
1999: Linda Horvath
2000: Linda Horvath
2001: Katrin Schöftner
2002: Gudrun Fischbacher
2003: Alexandra Dreier
2004: Daniela Kreichbaum
2005: Monika Gollner
2006: Monika Gollner

Pole vault
The 1995 women's pole vault event did not have official championship status.
1995: Monika Erlach
1996: Doris Auer
1997: Doris Auer
1998: Monika Erlach
1999: Doris Auer
2000: Doris Auer
2001: Michaela Kohlbauer
2002: Carmen Klausbruckner
2003: Carmen Klausbruckner
2004: Brigitta Pöll
2005: Doris Auer
2006: Carmen Klausbruckner

Long jump
1960: Erna Auer
1961: Sieglinde Pfannerstill
1962: Sieglinde Pfannerstill
1963: Sieglinde Pfannerstill
1964: Susanne Lindner
1965: Sieglinde Pfannerstill
1966: Sieglinde Pfannerstill
1967: Hanna Kleinpeter
1968: Hanna Kleinpeter
1969: Hanna Kleinpeter
1970: Hanna Kleinpeter
1971: Hanna Kleinpeter
1972: Hanna Kleinpeter
1973: Hanna Kleinpeter
1974: Hanna Kleinpeter
1975: Liese Prokop
1976: Irmgard Hölzl
1977: Irmgard Wöckinger
1978: Irmgard Wöckinger
1979: Edith Maier
1980: Petra Prenner
1981: Petra Prenner
1982: Petra Prenner
1983: Edith Maier
1984: Sabine Seitl
1985: Petra Prenner
1986: Regina Helfenbein
1987: Regina Weiskopf
1988: Ulrike Kleindl
1989: Ulrike Kleindl
1990: Ulrike Kleindl
1991: Ljudmila Ninova
1992: Ljudmila Ninova
1993: Ljudmila Ninova
1994: Ljudmila Ninova
1995: Ljudmila Ninova
1996: Ljudmila Ninova
1997: Ljudmila Ninova
1998: Olivia Wöckinger
1999: Olivia Wöckinger
2000: Manuela Witting
2001: Bianca Dürr
2002: Olivia Wöckinger
2003: Olivia Wöckinger
2004: Olivia Wöckinger
2005: Bianca Dürr
2006: Bianca Dürr

Triple jump
1990: Silvia Mayramhof
1991: Gabriele Unger
1992: Gabriele Unger
1993: Gudrun Fischbacher
1994: Christina Öppinger
1995: Christina Öppinger
1996: Christina Öppinger
1997: Christina Öppinger
1998: Katrin Pieringer
1999: Anja Mandl
2000: Olivia Wöckinger
2001: Olivia Wöckinger
2002: Olivia Wöckinger
2003: Olivia Wöckinger
2004: Olivia Wöckinger
2005: Olivia Wöckinger
2006: Michaela Egger

Shot put
1960: Dorli Hofrichter
1961: Herlinde Peyker
1962: Gerlinde Anderle
1963: Dorli Hofrichter
1964: Gerlinde Anderle
1965: Gerlinde Anderle
1966: Gerlinde Anderle
1967: Gerlinde Anderle
1968: Eva Janko
1969: Liese Prokop
1970: Erika Hofer
1971: Erika Hofer
1972: Liese Prokop
1973: Liese Prokop
1974: Liese Prokop
1975: Liese Prokop
1976: Liese Prokop
1977: Riki Lechner
1978: Susanne Spacek
1979: Stefanie Jagenbrein
1980: Melitta Aigner
1981: Melitta Aigner
1982: Melitta Aigner
1983: Melitta Aigner
1984: Ursula Weber
1985: Maria Schramseis
1986: Veronika Längle
1987: Karin Danninger
1988: Veronika Längle
1989: Veronika Längle
1990: Veronika Längle
1991: Sonja Spendelhofer
1992: Sonja Spendelhofer
1993: Sabine Bieber
1994: Sonja Spendelhofer
1995: Sonja Spendelhofer
1996: Sonja Spendelhofer
1997: Sonja Spendelhofer
1998: Sonja Spendelhofer
1999: Valentina Fedyushina
2000: Valentina Fedyushina
2001: Valentina Fedyushina
2002: Valentina Fedyushina
2003: Valentina Fedyushina
2004: Valentina Fedyushina
2005: Veronika Watzek
2006: Veronika Watzek

Discus throw
1960: Dorli Hofrichter
1961: Dorli Hofrichter
1962: Dorli Hofrichter
1963: Dorli Hofrichter
1964: Gerlinde Anderle
1965: Gerlinde Anderle
1966: Gerlinde Anderle
1967: Gitta Signoretti
1968: Gitta Signoretti
1969: Gitta Signoretti
1970: Gitta Signoretti
1971: Gitta Signoretti
1972: Gitta Signoretti
1973: Gitta Signoretti
1974: Gitta Hubner
1975: Gitta Hubner
1976: Gitta Hubner
1977: Gitta Hubner
1978: Susanne Spacek
1979: Gitta Hubner
1980: Gitta Hubner
1981: Irene Habisohn
1982: Maria Schramseis
1983: Maria Schramseis
1984: Maria Schramseis
1985: Maria Schramseis
1986: Ursula Weber
1987: Ursula Weber
1988: Ursula Weber
1989: Ursula Weber
1990: Ursula Weber
1991: Ursula Weber
1992: Ursula Weber
1993: Ursula Weber
1994: Maria Schramseis
1995: Sonja Spendelhofer
1996: Sonja Spendelhofer
1997: Sonja Spendelhofer
1998: Petra Feierfeilova
1999: Petra Feierfeilova
2000: Claudia Stern
2001: Sonja Spendelhofer
2002: Sonja Spendelhofer
2003: Sonja Spendelhofer
2004: Veronika Watzek
2005: Veronika Watzek
2006: Veronika Watzek

Hammer throw
The 1995 women's hammer throw event did not have official championship status.

1995: Claudia Stern
1996: Claudia Stern
1997: Claudia Stern
1998: Claudia Stern
1999: Claudia Stern
2000: Claudia Stern
2001: Claudia Stern
2002: Ute Atzmanniger
2003: Claudia Stern
2004: Claudia Stern
2005: Claudia Stern
2006: Claudia Stern

Javelin throw
1960: Traudl Schönauer
1961: Erika Strasser
1962: Erika Strasser
1963: Erika Strasser
1964: Traudl Schönauer
1965: Erika Strasser
1966: Eva Janko
1967: Erika Strasser
1968: Eva Janko
1969: Erika Strasser
1970: Eva Janko
1971: Inge Reiger
1972: Eva Janko
1973: Eva Janko
1974: Eva Janko
1975: Eva Janko
1976: Eva Janko
1977: Eva Janko
1978: Eva Janko
1979: Eva Janko
1980: Eva Janko
1981: Eva Janko
1982: Eva Janko
1983: Veronika Längle
1984: Veronika Längle
1985: Lisbeth Kucher
1986: Lisbeth Kucher
1987: Lisbeth Mischkounig
1988: Lisbeth Mischkounig
1989: Lisbeth Mischkounig
1990: Lisbeth Kucher
1991: Lisbeth Kucher
1992: Monika Brodschneider
1993: Monika Brodschneider
1994: Monika Brodschneider
1995: Monika Brodschneider
1996: Monika Brodschneider
1997: Monika Brodschneider
1998: Barbara Strass
1999: Sophia Bolzano
2000: Monika Brodschneider
2001: Ulrike Kalss
2002: Marion Obermayr
2003: Veronika Rösing
2004: Simone Igl
2005: Andrea Lindenthaler
2006: Elisabeth Eberl

Pentathlon
1960: Ulla Flegel
1961: Erna Auer
1962: Ulla Flegel
1963: Ulla Flegel
1964: Liese Sykora
1965: Liese Prokop
1966: Liese Prokop
1967: Eva Janko
1968: Liese Prokop
1969: Liese Prokop
1970: Maria Sykora
1971: Maria Sykora
1972: Eva Janko
1973: Liese Prokop
1974: Liese Prokop
1975: Liese Prokop
1976: Karin Danninger
1977: Riki Lechner
1978: Margit Danninger
1979: Helga Pargfrieder
1980: Melitta Aigner

Heptathlon
1981: Melitta Aigner
1982: Petra Prenner
1983: Melitta Aigner
1984: Beate Osterer
1985: Beate Osterer
1986: Sigrid Kirchmann
1987: Beate Krawcewicz
1988: Beate Krawcewicz
1989: Anni Spitzbart
1990: Beate Krawcewicz
1991: Kirsten Wakolbinger
1992: Doris Auer
1993: Christina Öppinger
1994: Sigrid Kirchmann
1995: Sabine Kirchmaier
1996: Bianca Dürr
1997: Bianca Dürr
1998: Bianca Dürr
1999: Marion Obermayr
2000: Marion Obermayr
2001: Ulrike Kalss
2002: Marion Obermayr
2003: Elisabeth Plazotta
2004: Elisabeth Plazotta
2005: Victoria Schreibeis

10 kilometres walk
The race 2002 was overly long by 500 m due to an organisational error.
1989: Elisabeth Siegele
1990: Viera Toporek
1991: Viera Toporek
1992: Viera Toporek
1993: Viera Toporek
1994: Viera Toporek
1995: Viera Toporek
1996: Viera Toporek
1997: Elisabeth Siegele
1998: Viera Toporek
1999: Viera Toporek
2000: Viera Toporek
2001: Viera Toporek
2002: Viera Toporek
2003: Viera Toporek
2004: Viera Toporek
2005: Gabriela Winkler
2006: Viera Toporek

20 kilometres walk
2003: Viera Toporek

Cross country
1960: Gaby Scholtes
1961: Maria Pfeiffer
1962: Bärbl Schatz
1963: Bärbl Schatz
1964: Bärbl Schatz
1965: Bärbl Schatz
1966: Heidi Ludwig
1967: Bärbl Schatz
1968: Maria Sykora
1969: Maria Sykora
1970: Maria Sykora
1971: Maria Sykora
1972: Angelika Schrott
1973: Angelika Schrott
1974: Angelika Schrott
1975: Angelika Schrott
1976: Angelika Schrott
1977: Margit Bichlbauer
1978: Anni Klemenjak
1979: Brigitte Sattlberger
1980: Anni Müller
1981: Doris Weilharter
1982: Maria Springer
1983: Maria Springer
1984: Anni Müller
1985: Anni Müller
1986: Anni Müller
1987: Verena Lechner
1988: Marion Feigl
1989: Anni Müller
1990: Verena Lechner
1991: Verena Lechner
1992: Elisabeth Hofer
1993: Susanne Fischer
1994: Gudrun Pflüger
1995: Viera Toporek
1996: Gudrun Pflüger
1997: Gudrun Pflüger
1998: Susanne Pumper
1999: Gudrun Pflüger
2000: Sandra Baumann
2001: Sandra Baumann
2002: Sandra Baumann
2003: Sandra Baumann
2004: Sandra Baumann
2005: Andrea Mayr
2006: Andrea Mayr

Mountain running
1984: Monika Frisch
1985: Andrea Zirknitzer
1986: Andrea Zirknitzer
1987: Anni Oberhofer
1988: Anni Oberhofer
1989: Elisabeth Singer
1990: Verena Lechner
1991: Carina Weber-Leutner
1992: Sabine Stelzmüller
1993: Elisabeth Rust
1994: Elisabeth Rust
1995: Gudrun Pflüger
1996: Gudrun Pflüger
1997: Karoline Käfer
1998: Franziska Krösbacher
1999: Karoline Käfer
2000: Elisabeth Rust
2001: Elisabeth Rust
2002: Andrea Mayr
2003: Andrea Mayr
2004: Sandra Baumann
2005: Sandra Baumann
2006: Andrea Mayr

References

Champions 1960–2006
Austrian Championships. GBR Athletics. Retrieved 2021-02-06.

Winners
 List
Austrian Championships
Athletics